The Bhrigu Saṃhitā is a Sanskrit astrological (Jyotisha) treatise attributed in its introduction to Bhrigu, one of the  "Saptarishis" ("seven sages") of the Vedic period. Its introductory chapter states that it was compiled by the saptrishi uttaradhikari out of compassion for humanity so that humanity could cope with the pressures of its existence and move towards a more spiritual nature. The Bhrigu Samhita claims to contain predictions about current and future lives as well as information about past lives.

Origin

Bhrigu's ashram 'Deepostak' was located near Dhosi Hill in present-day Haryana-Rajasthan border in India. Major parts of the Bhṛgu Saṃhitā were lost or destroyed.

Bhrigu was the first compiler of predictive astrology. He compiled an estimated 500,000 horoscopes and recorded the life details and events of various people. This formed a database for further research and study, which culminated in the birth of the art of determining the quality of time (Horā) and is the Bṛhat Parāśara Horāśāstra. These Horoscopes were based upon the planetary positions of the Sun, Moon, Mercury, Venus, Mars, Jupiter, Saturn, Rāhu (North Node of the Moon) and Ketu (South Node of the Moon).

After the first compiler, Bhṛigu gives his predictions on different types of horoscopes compiled by him claimed to be with the help of Gaṇeśa in a brief and concise manner. The total number of permutations/possible horoscope charts that can be drawn with this is about 45 million. Bhrigu taught this art of predictions to his son (Śukra) and other pupils. Currently a part of Bhrigu Samhita is available in Hoshiarpur/Sultanpur district of modern-day Punjab and Varanasi district of modern-day Uttar Pradesh.

References

External links
 Bhrigu Sanhita Paddhati (full text, Hindi) - 1949

Hindu astronomy
Hindu astrological texts
Vedic period